Sensunte Cabañas F.C. is a Salvadoran football club based in Sensuntepeque, Cabañas, El Salvador.

The club currently plays in the La Asociación Departamental de Fútbol Aficionado.

References

Sensunte